Urea perchlorate is a sheet-shaped crystallite with good chemical stability and strong hygroscopicity. It has usage as an oxidizer in liquid explosives including underwater blasting.

Synthesis 

The compound is synthesized by gradual addition of urea into a perchloric acid solution:

CO(NH2)2 + HClO4 → CO(NH2)2·HClO4

An alternative route is addition of urea to hydrochloric acid solution, followed by addition of sodium perchlorate, and filtration of the salt.

NaClO4·H2O + CO(NH2)2 + HCl → CO(NH2)2·HClO4 + NaCl + H2O

References

Explosive chemicals
Perchlorates